Joseph Hunter (May 7, 1839 – April 8, 1935) was a Scottish-born surveyor, civil engineer and political figure in British Columbia. He represented Cariboo from 1871 to 1875 and from 1900 to 1904 and Comox from 1890 to 1898 in the Legislative Assembly of British Columbia.

He was born in Aberdeen in 1839 and educated there, concluding his studies at the University of Aberdeen. Hunter came to Victoria, British Columbia in 1864.  From 1872, he worked performing surveys for the Canadian Pacific Railway. In 1875, he was employed by the Canadian government to establish a boundary between the province of British Columbia and the state of Alaska on the Stikine River. In 1883, he became chief engineer for the Esquimalt and Nanaimo Railway; in 1886, he also became general superintendent for that railway. In 1878, Hunter married Frances Ellen, the daughter of John Robson. He died in 1935, aged 94.

References 

1839 births
1935 deaths
Politicians from Aberdeen
Scottish emigrants to pre-Confederation British Columbia
Independent MLAs in British Columbia